HUDWAY is a California-based company that provides head-up displays. The company was founded in 2013 by cousins Ivan Klabukov and Alex Ostanin.

Products

HUDWAY Drive

HUDWAY Drive is a head-up display driving device that mounts onto a vehicle dash to bring needed information into driver’s line of sight. It allows users to stay focused, concentrated and connected to the world around them, creating a safer driving experience.

The device uses BLE to connect to a smartphone and an OBD-II scanner, then it can display the following information:
 Car data (speed, RPM, battery voltage, fuel consumption, fuel tank level, coolant temperature, oil temperature)
 Navigation
 Notifications
 Track name and artist

Setup can be done using the HUDWAY Drive app, available for iOS and Android.

HUDWAY Drive for Tesla Model 3 & Y 

In 2019, the company has first introduced their head-up display adapted to be used in Tesla Model 3 and Tesla Model Y vehicles.

In contrast with the standard HUDWAY Drive, the version for Tesla vehicles features a different body design to fit in the Tesla Model 3 & Y dashboard, and a different means of bringing the vehicle data to the HUD device.

Whereas the standard HUDWAY Drive uses the OBD-II interface which it accesses using a ELM327-based Bluetooth OBD-II scanner, the HUDWAY Drive Tesla Model 3/Y Edition transmitter connects to the vehicle through the 2xCAN interface.

The scope of Tesla data it can display, includes:

 Speed
 Speed limits captured by Tesla built-in camera
 Power
 G-sensor data
 Battery level
 Battery capacity
 Battery temperature
 Remaining range
 Average energy consumption
 Turn indicators
 Blind spot alerts
 Selected gear
 Current trip information (time, distance, average speed, etc.)

HUDWAY Glass

In March 2015, the company unveiled HUDWAY Glass to address the problem of distracted driving. HUDWAY Glass is a universal vehicle accessory that turns any smartphone into a head-up display for any car; it works with any apps that support HUD mode, including HUDWAY's own.

Affixed to the dashboard in drivers' line of sight, HUDWAY Glass is equipped with a semi-transparent glass that reflects navigation information off of drivers' cell phones display or screen and allows to see the road clearly nevertheless.  All that is needed is to launch any HUD-based app (navigation, speedometer, trip information) and place the phone on the cradle of the device. The reflection visibility is good on the device in any weather conditions, both during the day and night.

In fall 2015, HUDWAY ran a successful Kickstarter campaign raising over $600,000 to launch manufacturing of HUDWAY Glass.  Over 9,000 people all over the world backed the project resulting in over 11,000 units of HUDWAY Glass to be delivered.  In July 2016, the company began shipments to the backers. Starting in August 2016, HUDWAY Glass is available for sale.

HUDWAY app

HUDWAY app is an augmented-reality app that projects driving directions onto the windshield for driving in low-visibility conditions, especially at night, in fog, snow or heavy rain. HUDWAY app provides turn by turn directions (incl. driving speed, geographic location, upcoming curves and hills in the road and direction-giving voice assistant) and works off Google, Apple or OpenStreetMap maps.

In 2016, HUDWAY app was replaced by HUDWAY Go app.

Other apps

HUDWAY has a portfolio of HUD-based navigation related apps, including Speedometer by HUDWAY, HUDWAY Go and HUD Widgets app.

Awards and recognitions 
In January 2016, TWICE Magazine named HUDWAY Glass one of the most interesting products presented at CES 2016.

In February 2016, Fast Company named HUDWAY as one of the top 10 most innovative companies in the automotive sector for 2016, alongside Tesla and Ford.

In February 2016, HUDWAY received Global Startup of the Year award in Moscow, Russia.

In May 2022, Tom's Guide awarded HUDWAY Drive first place among aftermarket head-up displays.

See also 
 Optical head-mounted display
 Augmented reality
 HUD (video gaming)
 Virtual retinal display

References

External links 
 

Companies based in Los Angeles County, California
Huntington Beach, California
American companies established in 2013
2013 establishments in California